Abaiang Airport  is the airport serving Abaiang, Kiribati. It is located on Abaiang Island, between the villages of Tabwiroa (north) and Tuarabu (south).

The airport is served by Air Kiribati from South Tarawa and Marakei on Wednesdays, Fridays and Sundays. Flights to both destinations take only ten minutes, and cost 50 Australian dollars inclusive of departure tax.

Airlines and destinations

Notes

Airports in Kiribati